Hresk (Belarusian and Russian: Грэск), is an urban settlement in the Slutsk District of Minsk Region, Belarus, the administrative center of Hresk Selsoviet.

History
Within the Grand Duchy of Lithuania, Hresk was part of the Principality of Slutsk, itself a part of Nowogródek Voivodeship. In 1793, Hresk was acquired by the Russian Empire in the course of the Second Partition of Poland. It became a part of the Slutsky Uyezd of Minsk Governorate.

During World War II, Hresk was under German occupation from 27 June 1941 until 1 July 1944.

References

Villages in Belarus
Populated places in Minsk Region
Slutsk District
Nowogródek Voivodeship (1507–1795)
Slutsky Uyezd